John Toone (2 July 1872 – 1 September 1927) was an English cricketer. He played in one first-class match for Jamaica in 1895.

Jamaica played their first first-class match in late March 1895 against R. S. Lucas' English team, losing by an innings. A second match, 12-a-side like the first, was played a few days later, Toone coming into the team as an opening bowler. He took 7 for 29 and 6 for 51, bowling unchanged through each innings, and Jamaica won by eight wickets.

See also
 List of Jamaican representative cricketers

References

External links
 

1872 births
1927 deaths
English cricketers
Jamaica cricketers
People from Alfreton
Cricketers from Derbyshire